The Leica X2 is a digital large sensor compact camera announced by Leica Camera on 10 May 2012. It is the successor of the Leica X1, and improves on the earlier model with a higher resolution sensor, improved autofocus and an optionally available electronic viewfinder for easier use in bright light.

On 16 September 2014, the Leica X-E was announced, which is identical to the X2 except the exterior colour.

References
http://www.dpreview.com/products/leica/compacts/leica_x2/specifications

X2
Cameras introduced in 2012